The Fred Krause House in Hazen, North Dakota, United States, was built in 1916.  It has also been known as the Joe Friedlander House.  It was listed on the National Register of Historic Places (NRHP) in 1992.

According to its NRHP nomination, it is one of "a rare few" American Foursquare homes in North Dakota that "retain essential integrity of porch, siding and decorative features."

References

Houses in Mercer County, North Dakota
Houses completed in 1916
Houses on the National Register of Historic Places in North Dakota
National Register of Historic Places in Mercer County, North Dakota
American Foursquare architecture